San Dieguito County Park is a  park located on the border between Del Mar and Solana Beach, California, two incorporated cities in northern San Diego County. It is locally popular for barbecues, weddings, and other group gatherings; there are no campsites. Other facilities include a basketball court, hiking trails, a gazebo, and a playground. One border of the park is the historical El Camino Real, which is also called King's Highway and sometimes California Mission Trail.

The park is split into two sections, the upper park, which opened in 1965, and the lower park, which opened in 1977.     

The Miracle League of San Diego provides an opportunity for handicapped children to play baseball. The league has spring and fall seasons at the baseball field in the park.

External links
 Official San Dieguito County Park website

Parks in San Diego County, California
Regional parks in California
Del Mar, California
Solana Beach, California